Simione Kuruvoli (born 17 October 1951) is a Fijian judoka. He competed at the 1984 Summer Olympics and the 1988 Summer Olympics.

References

External links

1951 births
Living people
Fijian male judoka
Olympic judoka of Fiji
Judoka at the 1984 Summer Olympics
Judoka at the 1988 Summer Olympics
Place of birth missing (living people)